Diplophos is a genus of bristlemouths.

Species
There are currently five recognized species in this genus:
 Diplophos australis Ozawa, Oda & T. Ida, 1990
 Diplophos orientalis Matsubara, 1940
 Diplophos pacificus Günther, 1889
 Diplophos rebainsi G. Krefft & Parin, 1972 (Rebains' portholefish)
 Diplophos taenia Günther, 1873 (Pacific portholefish)

References

Gonostomatidae
Marine fish genera
Taxa named by Albert Günther